In 1995, The Flip Squad was formed as a group of the New York City hip-hop DJs. Curated by Funkmaster Flex, the group was originally a duo consisting of producers Big Kap and Bootleg. An extended roster was introduced in 1998 and billed as the Flip Squad Allstars, which included Funkmaster Flex, Biz Markie, DJ Enuff, Mister Cee, Cipha Sounds, Frankie Cutlass, DJ Riz, "BounceMasta" DJ Doo Wop and Mark Ronson. The group released an album titled The Flip Squad All-Star DJs  on MCA in November 1998.

References

External links

1995 establishments in New York City
1998 disestablishments in New York (state)
American hip hop DJs
Hip hop groups from New York City
Hip hop supergroups
Musical groups established in 1995
Musical groups disestablished in 1998